Sodium hexafluorophosphate is an inorganic compound with the chemical formula Na[PF6].

In 2015 it has been utilised as a component of non-aqueous electrolyte in rechargeable sodium-ion batteries. NaPF6 can be prepared by the reaction

PCl5 + NaCl + 6 HF → NaPF6 + 6 HCl

Further reading

References

Sodium compounds
Hexafluorophosphates